Barh Assembly constituency is one of 243 constituencies of legislative assembly of Bihar. It comes under Munger Lok Sabha constituency along with other assembly constituencies. Barh is in the 14 assembly segments which fall under Patna district.

Overview
Barh comprises CD Blocks Athmalgola, Belchhi & Barh; Gram Panchayats Dhiwar, Parsawan, Goasa Shekhpura & Bihari Bigha of Pandarak CD Block.

Members of Legislative Assembly

Election results

2010

References

External links
 

Assembly constituencies in Patna district
Politics of Patna district
Assembly constituencies of Bihar